Hot Country Songs is a chart that ranks the top-performing country music songs in the United States, published by Billboard magazine.  In 1994, 30 different songs topped the chart, then published under the title Hot Country Singles & Tracks, in 52 issues of the magazine, based on weekly airplay data from country music radio stations compiled by Nielsen Broadcast Data Systems.

Two artists reached number one with three different songs in 1994.  Clay Walker topped the chart with "Live Until I Die", "Dreaming with My Eyes Open" and "If I Could Make a Living", and John Michael Montgomery achieved the feat with "I Swear", "Be My Baby Tonight" and "If You've Got Love".  Montgomery also spent the most cumulative weeks at the top of the chart, with seven, one more than Neal McCoy, who spent six weeks at the top with "No Doubt About It" and "Wink".  Despite this level of chart success in 1994, the two songs remain McCoy's only number one hits.  Clay Walker's three number ones each spent only a single week in the top spot.  Other artists to achieve more than one number one in 1994 were Brooks & Dunn, Joe Diffie, Faith Hill and Alan Jackson.

In addition to McCoy, acts who reached number one for the first time in 1994 included Mary Chapin Carpenter with "Shut Up and Kiss Me", Little Texas with "My Love", and John Berry with "Your Love Amazes Me".  The final chart-topper of the year was "Pickup Man" by Joe Diffie.

Chart history

See also
1994 in music
List of artists who reached number one on the U.S. country chart

References

1994
1994 record charts
Country